The 2012–13 Persian Gulf Cup (also known as Iran Pro League) was the 30th season of Iran's Football League and 12th as Iran Pro League since its establishment in 2001. Sepahan were the defending champions. The season featured 15 teams from the 2011–12 Persian Gulf Cup and three new teams promoted from the 2011–12 Azadegan League: Paykan as champions, Aluminium Hormozgan and Gahar Zagros. The league started on 19 July 2012 and ended on 10 May 2013. Esteghlal won the Pro League title for the third time in their history (total eighth Iranian title).

Events

Competition format
After the 2012–13 Iran Pro League season the number of teams was planned to be reduced from 18 to 16 for the next season, so 4 team was directly relegated to the Azadegan League, while one team was played against the 3rd ranked team from the second division league team in a play-off. 2 teams also are directly promoted from current Azadegan league to the next pro league season and one team played against the 14th placed pro league team in a play-off.

Rules and regulations 
The Iranian Football Clubs who participate in 2012–13 Iran Pro League are allowed to have up to maximum 35 players (including up to maximum 4 non-Iranian players) in their player lists, which will be categorized in the following groups:
 Up to maximum 21 adult (over 23-year-old) players
 Up to maximum 6 under-23 players (i.e. the player whose birth is after 19 July 1989).
 Up to maximum 5 under-21 players (i.e. the player whose birth is after 19 July 1991).
 Up to maximum 3 under-19 players (i.e. the player whose birth is after 19 July 1993).

Based on the fact that the Season is started from 19 July 2012.

Teams

Stadia and locations

Number of teams by region

Personnel and kits

Note: Flags indicate national team as has been defined under FIFA eligibility rules. Players may hold more than one non-FIFA nationality.

Notes
 Esteghlal's captain was Mehdi Rahmati before Farhad Majidi rejoins to the team.
 Reza Haghighi was the captain of Fajr Sepasi until his transfer to the Persepolis.
 From 19 January 2013 to 18 March 2013, Ali Firouzi and from 18 March 2013, Saeed Salamaat were the caretaker head coaches of Sanat Naft due to Casimiro's illness.

Managerial changes

Before the start of the season

In season

League table

Results

Positions by round

Clubs season-progress

Relegation play-offs
Zob Ahan as 14th-placed team faced play-off winner of 2012–13 Azadegan League, Pas Hamedan in a two-legged play-off.

Zob Ahan won 5–3 on aggregate and retained its Iran Pro League spot for the 2013–14 season.

Season statistics

Top goalscorers 

 Last updated: 10 May 2013 Source: IPL Stats

Top assistants 

 Last updated: 10 May 2013 Sources:Varzesh3.com StatsIPL Stats

Clean sheets 

Last Update: 10 May 2013

Scoring 

First goal of the season: Mehdi Nazari for Fajr against Zob Ahan (19 July 2012)
Fastest goal of the season: 12 seconds, Gholamreza Rezaei for Persepolis against Fajr Sepasi (30 December 2012) 
Latest goal of the season: 96 minutes and 12 seconds, Karim Ansarifard for Persepolis against Zob Ahan (19 November 2012)
Largest winning margin: 6 goals
Persepolis 6–0 Paykan (31 October 2012)
Fajr 6–0 Aluminium (1 March 2013)
Zob Ahan 6–0 Sanat Naft (5 May 2013)
Highest scoring game: 8 goals
Damash 5–3 Paykan (31 July 2012)
Sanat Naft 2–6 Naft Tehran (6 August 2012)
Most goals scored in a match by a single team: 6 goals
Sanat Naft 2–6 Naft Tehran (18 August 2012)
Fajr 6–1 Damash (15 September 2012)
Persepolis 6–0 Paykan (31 October 2012)
Fajr 6–0 Aluminium (1 March 2013)
Most goals scored in a match by a losing team: 3 goals
Damash 5–3 Paykan (31 July 2012)
Naft Tehran 3–4 Sepahan (30 October 2012)
Sepahan 4–3 Zob Ahan (13 January 2013)

Hat-tricks

Awards

Team of the Season

Goalkeeper: Mehdi Rahmati (Esteghlal)
Defence: Mehrdad Jama'ati (Foolad), Pejman Montazeri (Esteghlal), Amir Hossein Sadeghi (Esteghlal), Khosro Heydari (Esteghlal)
Midfield: Reza Haghighi (Perspolis), Bakhtiar Rahmani (Foolad), Moharram Navidkia (Sepahan), Yaghoub Karimi (Naft.t)
Attack: Jalal Rafkhaei (Malavan), Mohammad Reza Khalatbari (Sepahan)

Player of the Season

Moharram Navidkia was awarded as the best player of the season among Mehdi Rahmati and Pejman Montazeri became second and third. Saeid Ezzatollahi was also awarded as the best young player of the season and Alireza Jahanbakhsh was ranked second.

Other awards

Amir Ghalenoei was awarded as the best coach of the season, Zlatko Kranjčar becomes second and Hossein Faraki third. Saeid Mozafarizadeh awarded best referee, Fair Play Award was given to the Fajr Sepasi and Esteghlal was the team of the season. Mehdi Mahdavikia, Ali Parvin, Homayoun Behzadi and Ali Jabari were also awarded for their service to the Iranian football.

Attendances

Average home attendances

Highest attendances

Notes:Updated to games played on 10 May 2013. Source: Iranleague.ir

See also 
 2012–13 Hazfi Cup
 2012–13 Azadegan League
 2012–13 Iran Football's 2nd Division
 2012–13 Iran Football's 3rd Division
 2012–13 Iranian Futsal Super League

Team season articles 
 2012–13 Persepolis F.C. season
 2012–13 Sepahan F.C. season
 2012–13 Esteghlal F.C. season
 2012–13 Saba Qom F.C. season
 2012–13 S.C. Damash season
 2012–13 Fajr Sepasi F.C. season

References 

https://web.archive.org/web/20150621212129/http://www.guilaneno.com/%D8%B5%D9%81%D8%AD%D9%87%20%D9%86%D8%AE%D8%B3%D8%AA

External links
 Iran Premier League 2014-2015
 2012–13 Persian Gulf Cup at PersianLeague
 2012–13 Persian Gulf Cup at Soccerway

Iran Pro League seasons
Iran
1